Sayyed Gholamreza Rouhani alias Ajjeneh (
17 May 1897 – 29 August 1985) was an Iranian humorous poet. Mohamad Ali Jamalzadeh called him "the chief of humorous poets".

Early life

Gholamreza Rouhani was born on 21st of Ordibehesht 1276 A.P (17 May 1897) in Mashhad. In 1919 at the age of 22 his poetry was published in several newspapers and various publications in Teheran such as Gooleh Zard, Nasim-e-Shomal, Nahid, Omid and Tofigh.

In 1921 Rouhani joined the Literary Society. The first forum was in the home of Shaikh-ol-raiis Afsar and later at the home of professor Mohammad Ali Naseh. In 1923 he became associated with some theater and music clubs including “Jameh Barbad” which was founded  by Professor Ismael Mehrtash.  Rouhani wrote many humorous poems for the theater and many of them became publicly famous.

In 1934 a collection of his poems called Tallyehe fokahyat Rouhani with an acknowledgment written by Sayyed Mohamad Ali Jamalzadeh was published. Due to popular demand it had to be reprinted again in 1935. In 1964 the complete collection of his poems entitled Kolyat ashar v fokahyat Rouhani, Ajjeneh (Complete humorous poems of Rouhani, Ajjeneh) was published by Sanai press.

These type of humorous poems were not widely recognized in the new period of Persian literature and very little was known about them. Gradually the poems of Sayyed Gholamreza Rouhani became a valuable source of inspiration for young people.   Today in Iran there are numerous "humorous" societies.

He was an active member of several literary societies such as Hakim Nezamy (Vahid Dastgerdi), Farhangstan (Mlkalshar-ay-baharr),  Literary Society of Shiraz, Literary Society of Azrabadgan, Literary Society of Tehran, Hafez Literary Society, Literary Society of Saneb, Nasr Literary Society, Daneshoravan Literary Society, and other associations and literary circles.  Rouhani was also active in creating songs as well as serious and humorous poems for music and theater clubs to be used in concerts and shows.

Sayyed Gholamreza Rouhani died in Tehran, Iran on September 1985 at the age of 88. Professor Jamalzadeh called him “The chief of humorous poets" and Mohammad Taghi Bahar remembers him in his poem after Iraj Mirza and Sayyed Ashrafaldyn Gilani.

Poetry

Rouhani wrote all his work in the language of everyday people from the street and markets and he used proverbs common to everyday uses, while also avoiding any vulgar language. His work shows familiarity with the language of his time and the use of slang words and the grassroots opinion of his own time are very interesting.  He was familiar with the use of rhymes and used them properly in his poems, with a manner that simply worked without  offending.

Two elements in his poetry which are more outstanding are, his humor and his illustration. His humor is sweet and heart warming which brings a smile on the lips of the reader. His poems and writings are tender and very easy and smooth to the ear.

Sayyed Gholamreza Rouhani used humorous writing to show the problems of the society of his time and he speaks of the suffering of the Iranian social conditions such as, drugs, smoking, superstition, lack of education, the pain of single women, ignorance, illiteracy, war, and the imitation of western culture. he saw that education would be the solution to these problems and would move people away from being lethargic and lazy.

Legacy

Today, many people in Iran recite his poems as proverbs without knowing who the writer is. Among them are the following:

“Mashine mashti mamdaly - nah bogh dareh nah sandaly”.

“Halvai tan tanaii - ta nakhory nadany”.

“Efadehha tebgh tebgh - sakha beh dorash vegh vegh”.

“Seplsht ayad v zan zayad v mehman beresad”.

Bibliography
Tallyehe fokahyat Rouhani (1934)
Kolyat ashar v fokahyat Rouhani, Ajjeneh (Complete collection of his poems), Sanai Press with acknowledgment written by Sayyad Mohamad Ali Jamalzadeh, 1964
Yeki Ye Poole Khorus, selection of Persian humorous poems
Borhane wazeh (Clear proof)

References

Sources
 Soroush Journal - Year VII - No. 308-20, October 1985, “Khandeh sazan and khandeh pardazan”.

1897 births
1985 deaths
Bahá'í poets
Iranian Bahá'ís
20th-century Iranian poets
Iranian satirists
Persian-language poets
20th-century Bahá'ís
19th-century Iranian poets